Drew McQueen Bledsoe (born February 14, 1972) is an American former professional football player who was a quarterback in the National Football League (NFL) for 14 seasons, primarily with the New England Patriots. He played college football at Washington State, where he won Pac-10 Offensive Player of the Year as a junior, and was selected by the Patriots first overall in the 1993 NFL Draft. Considered the face of the Patriots franchise during his nine seasons with the team, Bledsoe helped improve New England's fortunes from 1993 to 2001. Under Bledsoe, the Patriots ended a seven-year postseason drought, qualified for the playoffs four times, clinched their division twice, and made a Super Bowl appearance in Super Bowl XXXI. He was also named to three Pro Bowls and became the youngest quarterback to play in the NFL's all-star game with his 1995 appearance.

Following a period of declining success and two consecutive seasons in which the Patriots missed the playoffs, Bledsoe suffered a near-fatal injury early in the 2001 season that led to backup Tom Brady becoming the team's starter. He was unable to regain his starting position for the remainder of the season due to Brady's success, which led to the Patriots winning their first championship in Super Bowl XXXVI and began a dynasty for the franchise. Bledsoe subsequently played three seasons with the Buffalo Bills, where he made a fourth Pro Bowl appearance, and his final two with the Dallas Cowboys.

While his tenure with the Patriots would be eclipsed by Brady, Bledsoe is recognized for helping rebuild the franchise and his role during their first Super Bowl-winning season when he relieved an injured Brady to help win the 2001 AFC Championship. For his accomplishments in New England, he was inducted to the Patriots Hall of Fame in 2011.

High school years
Bledsoe attended Walla Walla High School and was a letterman in football, basketball, and track. In football, he was named a first-team All-State selection by the Tacoma News Tribune.

College years
Bledsoe spent his college career at Washington State University in Pullman back in 1990, where he went on to have a record-setting career in his 3 years there. After gaining the starting job at the end of the 1990 season as a true freshman (joined later by Jeff Tuel and Jayden de Laura as the only three in school history), he quickly became the face of the Cougars' offense. In 1992, Bledsoe led WSU to a 9–3 record (ranking #17 in the coaches poll and #15 in the AP) and a 31–28 win over Utah in the Copper Bowl in which Bledsoe completed 30 of 46 passes for 476 yards and two touchdowns. He also established WSU records in single-game passing yards (476), single-season pass completions (241), and single-season passing yards (3,246). He was named the Pac-10 Offensive Player of the Year.

Following an impressive junior year in 1992, Bledsoe decided to forgo his senior season and enter the 1993 NFL Draft. In the 34 starts of his collegiate career he amassed 7,373 yards, 532 completions and 46 touchdowns.

Professional career

New England Patriots: 1993–2001
Bledsoe was the first overall selection in the 1993 NFL Draft by the New England Patriots. He started right away for the Patriots in his rookie season, as they improved from two to five wins.

On November 13, 1994, the Patriots had won just three of their first nine games and were losing, 20–3, to the Minnesota Vikings at halftime. Bledsoe led a comeback victory in which the Patriots won, 26–20, in overtime, as he set single-game records in pass completions (45) and attempts (70). The win sparked the beginning of a new age for the Patriots, as they rallied behind Bledsoe and won their final six games to finish with a 10–6 record and capture the wild card spot; however, they lost to the Cleveland Browns in the wild-card round 20–13, whose defensive coordinator was Bill Belichick. Due to his performance, Bledsoe was selected to his first Pro Bowl as an alternate.

Following a difficult 1995 season, Bledsoe turned it around in 1996 ranking among the top passers in the league with the help of wide receiver Terry Glenn, thus pushing the Patriots to reach the playoffs again and winning the AFC championship over the Jacksonville Jaguars, 20–6. This led to an appearance in Super Bowl XXXI, where they lost to the Green Bay Packers, 35–21. Bledsoe completed 25 of 48 passes for 253 yards, two touchdowns, and four interceptions in the loss. He was also named a starter for the Pro Bowl that season, the second of his career.

During the 1997 season, Bledsoe helped the Patriots win five of their final seven games to once again qualify for the playoffs, the fourth time in eight years as a Patriots starter he would lead the team to a postseason appearance. The Patriots lost in the second round to the Pittsburgh Steelers; however, Bledsoe built a career-high 87.7 passer rating, passed for 3,706 yards, tossed 28 touchdowns, and earned his third Pro Bowl invitation.

The following year, he became the first NFL quarterback to complete game-winning touchdown passes in the final 30 seconds of two consecutive games. In doing so, he propelled New England into the postseason for the third straight year. He completed these come-from-behind efforts while playing with a broken index finger on his throwing hand, an injury that would later sideline him for the postseason.

Bledsoe started the 1999 season very strong, with thirteen touchdowns and only four interceptions as the Patriots held a 6–2 mid-season record. However, Bledsoe subsequently threw only six touchdowns versus seventeen interceptions, and the team finished with an 8–8 record, while Bledsoe was sacked a career-high 55 times. The team's slide continued into the 2000 season as the Patriots ended with a record of 5–11. Bledsoe threw a then-career low thirteen interceptions that year but he was sacked 45 times.

In March 2001, Bledsoe signed a then-record ten-year, $103 million contract. During the second game of the 2001 season, Bledsoe was racing toward the sideline on third-and-10 when New York Jets linebacker Mo Lewis leveled him with a hard, but clean hit. Bledsoe was about to dive for the first down marker, but defensive end Shaun Ellis clipped Bledsoe's ankles as he was about to dive, resulting in Lewis hitting Bledsoe while he was standing straight up. With Bledsoe appearing to have suffered a concussion, backup Tom Brady came in to finish the game. After the game, team trainer Ron O'Neill suspected Bledsoe did not look right and asked Bledsoe to come to the medical room for evaluation. Team doctor Bert Zarins ran some tests and discovered Bledsoe's heart was racing. Zarins realized that this was something much more serious than a concussion; normally, concussed people have their heart rates tail off dramatically. Bledsoe was rushed to the hospital, where it was discovered that Lewis' hit had sheared a blood vessel in his chest, causing a hemothorax that had him bleeding a pint of blood an hour.

Brady took the starting job and led New England to the playoffs. Bledsoe would never regain his starting role (Brady played 19 seasons in New England), although he proved integral to his team's playoff run when he replaced a hobbled Brady in the AFC Championship Game against Pittsburgh. Bledsoe, starting from the Steelers' 40-yard line, capped a scoring drive with an 11-yard touchdown pass to David Patten to give the Patriots a 14–3 lead, as well as all of the momentum going into halftime. With the Steelers trailing by four points in the fourth quarter, Bledsoe put together a 45-yard drive to put the Patriots in field goal range where Adam Vinatieri converted to make the score 24–17. Bledsoe later drove New England into Steelers territory to set up a 50-yard kick to seal the game, however Vinatieri missed and the ball went back to Pittsburgh. The Patriots defense held, and with a final score of 24–17 the upset was complete and the Patriots moved onto the Super Bowl. In winning the conference championship game, Bledsoe completed 10 of 21 passes for 102 yards and a touchdown, with no interceptions. It was the second time in six years (1996 and 2001) that Bledsoe was an integral part in leading the Patriots to a Super Bowl appearance, and during the on-field trophy presentation Bledsoe tossed his father a game ball. Brady started as quarterback as the Patriots won Super Bowl XXXVI, with kicker Vinatieri hitting a game-winning 48-yard field goal as time expired.

With Brady entrenched as the starter, Bledsoe was traded to the Patriots' division rival, the Buffalo Bills. Patriots fans appreciated Bledsoe's lengthy tenure and his role in improving the team, and cheered him in each of his three returns to New England as a visiting player.

Buffalo Bills: 2002–2004
Being sent to the Bills seemed to give Bledsoe a bit of rejuvenation in 2002. He had one of his best seasons ever, passing for 4,359 yards and 24 touchdowns and making his fourth trip to the Pro Bowl. In Week 2 against the Minnesota Vikings, Bledsoe set a team record with 463 yards passing in an overtime win. He continued his strong play in 2003 as the Bills began the year 2–0. However, a flurry of injuries stymied the Bills offense; they failed to score a touchdown in three consecutive games en route to a 6–10 season. In 2004, they fell one game short of making the playoffs; a late season winning streak was wasted when Bledsoe and the Bills performed poorly against the Pittsburgh Steelers backups in the season finale, finishing with a record of 9-7.

Bledsoe was released by the Bills after the 2004 season to make way for first-round draft pick J. P. Losman to become the starter. When Bledsoe was later signed by the Dallas Cowboys, he expressed bitterness with the Bills for the move, stating "I can't wait to go home and dress my kids in little stars and get rid of the other team's [Buffalo's] stuff."

Dallas Cowboys: 2005–2006

Bledsoe went on to sign with the Dallas Cowboys, where he was reunited with former coach Bill Parcells and wide receiver Terry Glenn. Bledsoe was intended to be a long-term solution as quarterback for the Cowboys. Said Bledsoe on the day he signed with Dallas, "Bill [Parcells] wants me here, and being the starter. I anticipate that being the case and not for one year." He signed for $23 million for three years.

During his tenure with the Cowboys, he threw for over 3,000 yards in a season for the ninth time in his career, tying Warren Moon for fourth in NFL history. That season, Bledsoe led five 4th-quarter/OT game-winning drives to keep the Cowboys' playoff hopes alive until the final day of the season. Though the team ultimately failed to reach the playoffs, Bledsoe had led them to a 9–7 record, an improvement over the 6–10 mark that Vinny Testaverde had finished with in 2004.

However, in 2006, his final season with the Cowboys, Bledsoe's play became erratic, so much so that six games into the season he was replaced by future Pro Bowler Tony Romo. Shortly after the end of the 2006 season, Bledsoe was released by the Cowboys. Unwilling to be relegated to a backup position, Bledsoe announced his retirement from the NFL on April 11, 2007.

Retirement and legacy
When Bledsoe retired in April 2007, he left fifth in NFL history in pass attempts (6,717) and completions (3,839), seventh in passing yards (44,611), and thirteenth in touchdown passes (251).

On May 16, 2011, Bledsoe was voted by Patriots fans into the Patriots Hall of Fame. He was formally inducted in a public ceremony outside The Hall at Patriot Place on September 17, 2011. Bledsoe beat former head coach Bill Parcells and defensive lineman Houston Antwine in a fan vote.

In July 2012, Bledsoe was named the 30th-greatest quarterback of the NFL's post-merger era by Football Nation.

In January 2018, Bledsoe was named honorary captain of the New England Patriots as they hosted the Jacksonville Jaguars in the AFC Championship Game. Bledsoe's Patriots had beaten the Jaguars 20–6 in the 1996 AFC Championship Game to advance to their second Super Bowl. Patriots owner Robert Kraft said in a statement "Drew Bledsoe played such an integral role in our efforts to rebuild the Patriots. He gave fans hope for the future by providing many memorable moments during his record-breaking career. For a franchise that had only hosted one playoff game in its first 35 years, winning the AFC Championship Game at home in Foxborough and taking the Patriots to the playoffs for three consecutive years were unimaginable goals prior to his arrival." The Patriots defeated the Jaguars 24–20 to advance to their tenth Super Bowl appearance and Bledsoe presented the Lamar Hunt Trophy to Kraft.

Personal life
Bledsoe's parents were school teachers in Ellensburg, Washington. His mother was a teacher at Lewis & Clark Middle School, located in Yakima, Washington. His father was a coach who ran a football camp in Washington state, and Drew was able to interact with the professional players and coaches who helped his father run the camp. He is the fourth cousin once removed of actor, Neal Bledsoe.

The Bledsoe family moved five times before Drew was in sixth grade. They finally settled in Walla Walla, Washington, where Bledsoe's father coached football at the high school. The only time Drew played a whole season of football without ever starting at quarterback was in seventh grade at Pioneer Junior High. In high school, with his father as his coach, he won numerous awards, including selection to the Western 100 and Washington State Player of the Year. Heavily recruited by colleges such as Miami and Washington, he decided to attend Washington State, which was a mere two-hour drive from home.

Drew and his wife Maura live in Bend, Oregon, where Maura (née Healy) has family ties, and have four children: sons Stuart, John, Henry, and daughter Healy. He coached his sons, Stuart and John, at Summit High School. John was a walk-on player on the Washington State football team in 2017. Due to Bledsoe's growing wine business, he travels to Walla Walla regularly, sometimes more than once in a given week; he and Maura plan to move to Walla Walla after their youngest child graduates from high school in 2021.

While playing for the New England Patriots, Bledsoe lived in Bridgewater, Massachusetts and Medfield, Massachusetts; his Medfield house was later purchased by former Major League Baseball player Curt Schilling.

After his retirement in 2007, Bledsoe founded the Doubleback Winery along with close friend Chris Figgins. After the 2014 vintage, Figgins left Doubleback and handed his interest in the business to his protege Josh McDaniels (not related to the Patriots assistant coach of the same name). The company's grapes, mostly Cabernet Sauvignon and Chardonnay, are harvested from McQueen Vineyards and Flying B Vineyards, located in and around Walla Walla, Washington. The wine saw some critical success and placed 53rd overall in Wine Spectator Top 100 wines in 2010. His first vintage, 2007, quickly sold out of its initial 600 cases. In 2012, Marvin R. Shanken invited Ernie Els, Greg Norman, Tom Seaver, and Bledsoe to introduce his wines, despite Shanken's disdain for the New England Patriots. He also recorded a message to both Tony Romo and Dak Prescott in 2017 in his home, which also showed his red wine collection. In 2021, Drew purchased an  property in Oregon’s Eola-Amity Hills AVA with his winemaker and business partner Josh McDaniels. 

In his spare time, Bledsoe works with many philanthropic organizations.

Bledsoe has held the position of offensive coordinator/quarterbacks coach at Summit High School since 2012.

NFL career statistics

Regular season

Postseason

Accomplishments

 His 4,452 pass attempts in his first eight seasons rank second to Brett Favre whose 4,456 attempts are the most by a quarterback during any eight-year period in NFL history.
 His 70 pass attempts in a single game is still an active league record.
 He passed for 3,291 yards in 2000, his seventh consecutive season with at least 3,000 yards passing.
 Bledsoe was durable during his career, playing in 126 of his first 132 games since entering the league in 1993, and never missing a start after leaving NE until benched in 2006.
 In 2002, his first season in Buffalo, he set single season records for yards, attempts, completions on an offense that had 7 other franchise records.
 In 1998, he directed the Patriots to the playoffs for the fourth time in six seasons.
 In 1994, he set Patriots franchise single-season passing records for attempts (691), completions (400) and yards passing (4,555; surpassed by Tom Brady in 2007).
 In 1995, he set a franchise record by attempting 179 consecutive passes without an interception (10/23/95 to 11/26/95; since surpassed by Tom Brady).
 At the age of 23, he became the youngest player in NFL history to surpass the 10,000-yard passing plateau when he connected with Ben Coates on a 6-yard completion just before the half vs. the Jets (12/10/95).
 Prior to 1994, the Patriots' single-season record for passing yards was 3,465 yards. Bledsoe eclipsed that mark six consecutive seasons.
 At the age of 22, he became the youngest quarterback in NFL history to play in the Pro Bowl.
 Led 31 career 4th-quarter or OT game-winning drives and holds the record for most TD passes in overtime with 4.

While Bledsoe has thrown for a high number of yards and attempts, a frequent criticism is that they are based on volume (attempts, completions, yards) rather than efficiency (passer rating, TD-to-INT ratio, yards per attempt) proving only that he has thrown a great number of times, not that he has thrown well. According to sports writer Don Banks, Bledsoe's large career totals "reveal more about his longevity than about his excellence".

Bledsoe ranks fifth all time in completions (3,839), seventh in passing yards (44,611), and thirteenth in touchdown passes (251). Bledsoe's passer rating of 77.1 was 46th all-time in league history when he retired in 2006. As of 2022, he ranks 109th in league history. His 57.2% completion percentage is tied for 99th in league history. Bledsoe's 37 regular season 300-yard passing games ranks ninth in league history. He also ranks sixth in most career regular-season 400-yard passing games by an NFL quarterback, having done it six times. He was selected to the Pro Bowl four times (in 1994, 1996, 1997, 2002). Bledsoe was eligible for the Pro Football Hall of Fame in 2011.

See also
 List of NFL quarterbacks who have posted a perfect passer rating
 List of celebrities who own wineries and vineyards
 List of most consecutive starts by a National Football League quarterback

References

External links

 New England Patriots bio
 Humanitarian Bio
 

1972 births
Living people
American Conference Pro Bowl players
American football quarterbacks
American philanthropists
American winemakers
Buffalo Bills players
Dallas Cowboys players
Ed Block Courage Award recipients
National Football League first-overall draft picks
New England Patriots players
People from Ellensburg, Washington
People from Foxborough, Massachusetts
People from Medfield, Massachusetts
Players of American football from Boston
Players of American football from Washington (state)
Sportspeople from Norfolk County, Massachusetts
Sportspeople from Walla Walla, Washington
Washington State Cougars football players